Oli Beaudoin is a Juno Award winning drummer, record producer, composer and mixer.

He is the former drummer for Kataklysm, Ex Deo, Neuraxis, and live drummer for Belphehor and Keep of Kalessin. Beaudoin currently works as a producer and mixer out of his own studio, Pirate Studios Quebec.

Beaudoin is also a drum clinician and instructor, previously performing at the 
Montreal Drum Fest 2011. Beaudoin has been featured by several drumming magazines, including Drums Etc (Canada - Sept. 2014 - magazine cover), Revolver (US - Aug/Sep 2015) and Drumheads (June/July 2016).

Beaudoin has previously been endorsed by: Pearl Drums, Paiste cymbals, Vic Firth sticks, Evans Drumheads, Puresound Snare Wires, Sennheiser microphones, Humes & Berg Drum cases, Roland V-Drums, Neural DSP plugins, GASP bodybuilding clothes, 64 Audio In-Ear Monitors, Czarcie Kopyto drum Pedals and SlapKlatz Gel Dampers.

Discography
 Kataklysm – Unconquered (2020) – Nuclear Blast
 Ex Deo – The Philosopher King - Single (2020) – Napalm Records
 Eyexist - Celebrated Chaos (2020) - Independent
 Kataklysm – Meditations (2018) – Nuclear Blast
 Ex Deo – The Immortal Wars (2017) – Napalm Records
 Eyexist - The Digital Holocaust (2016) - PRC Music
 Kataklysm – Of Ghosts and Gods (2015) – Nuclear Blast
 Kataklysm – Waiting for the End to Come (2013) – Nuclear Blast
 Neuraxis – Asylon (2011) – Prosthetic Records
 Stareblind – Something Left Unexplained (2009) – Independent

Live
 Ex Deo (2012)-to (2020).
 Kataklysm (2012)-to (2020).
 Keep of Kalessin (2011) Mayhem North American Headlining tour
 Montreal Drum Festival (2011) Drum clinician/performance
 Belphegor (2011) South American Headlining tour
 Neuraxis (2011) Sepultura North American Headlining tour
 Neuraxis (2011) Deicide North American Headlining tour
 OVIF (2009–2011)

Producer Credits
P (Produced)

E (Engineered)

M (Mix)

MA (Mastered)

A (Arranged)

D (Drummer)

B (Bass)

 Kataklysm – “And Then I Saw Blood” Paiste Factory Drum Playthrough (2020) – M – MA – D
 All Is Ashes – TBA – P-E-M-MA-A-D-B
 MetalX – TBA – P-E-M-MA-A-D
 Exhorted – Old Bastards Never Die (2021) – P-M-MA
 Kataklysm – Unconquered (2020) – E-D
 Ex Deo – The Philosopher King (2020) – Napalm Records – E-D
 Eyexist – Celebrated Chaos (2020) – Independent – P-E-M-MA-A-D-B
 100 Remords – Le Feu en Moi (2019) – Independent – E-M-MA
 Kataklysm – Meditations (2018) – P-E-A-D
 Kataklysm – A Moment In Time Live DVD (2018) – E (Digital Editing)-D
 Ex Deo – The Immortal Wars (2016) – Napalm Records – E-A-D
 Eyexist – The Digital Holocaust (2016) – PRC MUSIC – P-E-M-MA-A-D-B
 100 Remords – Blessures (2016) – Independent – P-E-M-MA-A
 Conceived By Hate  – Summoning The Graves (single) (2016) – Deathgasm Records – M-MA
 Kataklysm – Of Ghosts and Gods (2015) – Nuclear Blast Records – E-A-D
 Kataklysm – Waiting for the End to Come (2013) – Nuclear Blast Records – E-A-D
 Neuraxis (band) – Asylon (2011) – Prosthetic Records – A-D
 Stareblind – Something Left Unexplained (2009) – A-D

References

1984 births
Living people
Musicians from Montreal
Canadian male drummers
21st-century Canadian drummers
21st-century Canadian male musicians